Glipodes bordoni is a beetle in the genus Glipodes of the family Mordellidae. It was described in 1990 by Franciscolo.

References

Mordellidae
Beetles described in 1990